Emilie Cosman, known as Milein Cosman, (31 March 1921 – 21 November 2017) was a German-born artist based in England. She is best known for her drawings and prints of leading cultural figures, dancers and musicians in action, such as Francis Bacon, Mikhail Baryshnikov, T. S. Eliot and Igor Stravinsky.

Biography
Milein Cosman was born in Gotha, Germany, in 1921, but spent most of her childhood in Düsseldorf. Because of her Jewish background and the rise of National Socialism, she went to school in Switzerland, at the Ecole d'Humanité and the International School of Geneva between 1937 and 1939. She came to England in 1939.

Between 1939 and 1942, Cosman studied at the Slade School of Art. The Slade was located in Oxford during the war years and there Cosman studied drawing under Randolph Schwabe and lithography under Harold Jones. In 1943 she attended evening classes at Oxford Polytechnic, where she was taught by Bernard Meninsky. In the same year she started teaching French and Art at a convent school as well as giving lectures on Art for the Workers' Educational Association (WEA).

In 1946, Cosman moved to London. She began book illustration and working as a freelance artist, while continuing to teach evening classes for the WEA and working for the American Broadcasting Station in Europe. She contributed drawings to national and international magazines and newspapers, including the BBC’s Radio Times. Particularly noteworthy is a commission from Heute to draw Konrad Adenauer's post-war cabinet in Germany 1949. These drawings were acquired by the German Government Art Collection in 2019 and their first public exhibition as a collection was opened at the German Bundestag in Berlin in April 2022.

In 1947, Cosman met the Viennese-born musician, writer, broadcaster and teacher Hans Keller (1919-1985), whom she married in 1961. Some books of his writings – The Jerusalem Diary (2001), Stravinsky The Music Maker (2010) and Britten (2013), for example – include many of her drawings and prints. Hans and Milein lived in Hampstead, where their many friends included the artist Marie-Louise von Motesiczky.

Milein Cosman made a series of schools programmes on drawing for ITV in 1958. In all, she had nearly 30 solo exhibitions in the UK and abroad and her work has been acquired by many leading museums including the British Museum, the Victoria and Albert Museum, the National Portrait Gallery, the Ashmolean Museum, the Fitzwilliam Museum in Cambridge, the Hunterian Museum in Glasgow, the Palais des Beaux-Arts in Brussels and the Kupferstichkabinett in Berlin. She was renowned for drawing quickly, and much of her work was done from the wings or auditorium during rehearsals for concerts, theatrical and dance performances, capturing movement “in mid-flight” as Ernst Gombrich put it.

In 2006, Cosman founded the Cosman Keller Art and Music Trust, which aims to support young musicians and artists as well as publishing, exhibiting and archiving her own and Hans Keller’s work. In 2014, a documentary film on Milein Cosman made by Christoph Böll was premiered in Düsseldorf in her presence.

Cosman died in November 2017. She bequeathed a set of over 1300 drawings to the Royal College of Music, London. Before her death Cosman bequeathed drawings, sketchbooks, etchings and oil paintings, The Milein Cosman Dancers Collection, to the Department of Music and Dance Studies at the University of Salzburg. A biography and comprehensive overview of Cosman's art by art historian Ines Schlenker was released in 2019.

Books produced or illustrated by Cosman
 Hans Keller and Donald Mitchell (eds) (with drawings by Cosman): Benjamin Britten: A Commentary on his Work from a Group of Specialists (London, Rockliff, 1952) 
 Musical Sketchbook (Bruno Cassirer, Oxford, 1957)
 Neville Cardus (with drawings by Cosman): Composer's Eleven (London, 1958)  
 (with Hans Keller): Stravinsky at Rehearsal (1962; published in Germany as Stravinsky Dirigiert)
 (with Hans Keller): 1975 (1984 minus 9) (London, 1977)
 (with Hans Keller): Stravinsky Seen and Heard (Toccata Press, 1982). Reissued as Stravinsky The Music Maker (ed. M. Anderson, Toccata Press, 2010)
 (With Hans Keller): The Jerusalem Diary - Music, Society and Politics, 1977 and 1979 (ed. C. Wintle & F. Williams, Plumbago Books, 2001)
 Lebenslinien/Lifelines (ed. Thomas B Schumann and Julian Hogg, Edition Memoria, Cologne, 2012)
  (with Hans Keller): Britten London, Plumbago Books and Arts, 2013,  (hardback), 978-0-95660075-2 (softback)
 Milein Cosman: Capturing Time (Ines Schlenker, Prestel, Munich, 2019,  (hardback))

Solo exhibitions
1949: Berkeley Gardens, London

1957: Matthiessen Gallery, London

1968: City of London Festival

1969: Camden Arts Festival

1970: Theatre des Champs-Élysées (Festival International de Danse, British Council), Paris

1974: Ryder Gallery, Los Angeles

1984: Yehudi Menuhin School, Surrey

1984: Dartington Hall, Devon

1988: Stadtmuseum, Düsseldorf

1990: Clare Hall, University of Cambridge

1996: Belgrave Gallery, London

2007: Palais des Beaux Arts, Brussels

2008: Austrian Cultural Forum, London

2014: Hunterian Museum, Glasgow

2014: Kunstforum, Gotha

2015: Rathaus, Düsseldorf

2019: Clare Hall, University of Cambridge

2021: Stadtmuseum, Düsseldorf (centenary exhibition of works by Ilde Schrader and Milein Cosman, who were childhood friends)

2021: Royal College of Music, London (permanent exhibition of drawings of musicians by Milein Cosman)

2021: Hampstead School of Art, London

2022: Bundestag, Berlin (a joint exhibition including works from the art collection of the Akademie der Künste) 

2022: Palais des Beaux Arts (Bozar), Brussels (permanent exhibition of drawings of musicians by Milein Cosman) 

2022: Haus Hövener, Brilon (exhibition of works by Milein Cosman and Ilde Schrader)

References

External links

Works in the National Portrait Gallery, London
Drawings of musicians at the Royal College of Music, London
The Cosman Collection at the Wigmore Hall, London
Musical portraits by Milein Cosman on Google Arts and Culture
Dancers by Milein Cosman on Google Arts and Culture
Collection Milein Cosman at the University of Salzburg
Works by Milein Cosman at the Hunterian Museum, University of Glasgow
Milein Cosman at the Akademie der Künste, Berlin
Exhibition at the German Bundestag of portraits from politics and art by Milein Cosman
Interview with Milein Cosman on BBC radio
The Cosman Keller Art & Music Trust

1921 births
2017 deaths
Alumni of the Slade School of Fine Art
British illustrators
German illustrators
British women illustrators
German women illustrators
Jewish artists
Jewish emigrants from Nazi Germany to the United Kingdom
Tolkien artists
German expatriates in Switzerland
International School of Geneva alumni
Ecole d'Humanité alumni